The Russian Cup (Кубок России) is a rugby league competition held annually by the Russian Rugby League Federation for professional, semi-professional and amateur clubs in Russia. All clubs from the Russian Championship competition compete in the Russian Cup, along with amateur clubs from around Russia and its various districts.

See also

Rugby league in Russia
Russian Championship

External links 
 Results of the 2006 Season
 Google-Video

Rugby league in Russia